Former President Zine El Abidine Ben Ali has maintained Tunisia's long-time policy of seeking good relations with the West, while playing an active role in Arab and African regional bodies. President Habib Bourguiba took a nonaligned stance but emphasized close relations with Europe, Pakistan, and the United States.

Bilateral relations

Africa

Americas

Asia
Tunisia has long been a voice for moderation and realism in the Middle East. Tunisia served as the headquarters of the Arab League from 1979 to 1990 and hosted the Palestine Liberation Organization's (PLO) headquarters from 1982 to 1993, when the PLO Executive Committee relocated to Jericho and the Palestinian Authority was established after the signing of the Oslo Accords. The PLO Political Department remains in Tunis.

Tunisia consistently has played a moderating role in the negotiations for a comprehensive Middle East peace. In 1993, Tunisia was the first Arab country to host an official Israeli delegation as part of the Middle East peace process and maintained an Interests Section until the outbreak in 2000 of the Intifada. Israeli citizens of Tunisian descent may travel to Tunisia on their Israeli passports.

Europe

Oceania

Foreign Ambassadors
Farid Abboud, Lebanese Ambassador to Tunisia (2007–2013)
Jacob Walles, American Ambassador to Tunisia (2012–2016) Preceded by Daniel Rubinstein

See also
List of diplomatic missions in Tunisia
List of diplomatic missions of Tunisia

Notes

Footnotes